Kevin Joseph Hickman (born August 20, 1971) is an American former football tight end who played in the National Football League for the Detroit Lions from 1995 to 1998.

Born in Cherry Hill, New Jersey, Hickman played high school football at Holy Cross Academy and Marine Military Academy. He attended the United States Naval Academy but left before completing his degree to play in the NFL. After his NFL career he returned to school a received a Bachelor's degree from the University of South Carolina in 2001, a Master's degree from American InterContinental University in 2007, and doctorate in education from Northcentral University in 2016. Hickman has worked as a high school athletic administrator at schools in California, Nevada, Arizona, and Ohio.

References

1971 births
Living people
Detroit Lions players
American football tight ends
Holy Cross Academy (New Jersey) alumni
Players of American football from New Jersey
People from Cherry Hill, New Jersey
Sportspeople from Camden County, New Jersey
Navy Midshipmen football players
Military personnel from New Jersey